St. John's Episcopal Church is a historic Episcopal church located at Cape Vincent in Jefferson County, New York. It was built in 1841 and consists of a one-story main block and a lower side wing in the Federal style.  A three-story entry tower projects from the central bay of the front facade.  The tower features an eight sided spire.  Also on the property is the parish cemetery with the earliest gravestones dating to 1852.

It was listed on the National Register of Historic Places in 1985.

References

Churches on the National Register of Historic Places in New York (state)
Episcopal church buildings in New York (state)
Federal architecture in New York (state)
Churches completed in 1841
19th-century Episcopal church buildings
Churches in Jefferson County, New York
National Register of Historic Places in Jefferson County, New York